The Pentele Bridge or M8 Danube Bridge is a highway bridge spanning river Danube between Dunavecse and Dunaújváros. Construction was completed on 13 March 2007. The Pentele Bridge got her name after the village Dunapentele (now part of Dunaújváros). It is part of the planned M8 motorway, connecting M6 motorway on the west and highway 51 on the east bank.

Design and construction
The river bridge's superstructure rests on two  reinforced concrete pillars in the river bed, the right approach is supported by 14, the left one by 5 pillars. The arches rise 47.6 meters above the carriageway and are tilted inwards at an angle of 16.5° from vertical resembling a basket handle. The suspension cables run parallel, in the plane of the arches.

The main section of the bridge was assembled on the shore and floated in place using 8 barges of 1600 ton capacity each.

See also
List of crossings of the Danube River

External links 
 Dunaújvárosi Bridge's web camera
 Bridge Design & Engineering
 Pentele extrem bridge

Bridges over the Danube
Bridges completed in 2007
Bridges in Hungary